The United States District Court for the Southern District of Texas (in case citations, S.D. Tex.) is the federal district court with jurisdiction over the southeastern part of Texas. The court's headquarters is in Houston, Texas and has six additional locations in the district.

Appeals from cases brought in the Southern District of Texas are taken to the United States Court of Appeals for the Fifth Circuit (except for patent claims and claims against the U.S. government under the Tucker Act, which are appealed to the Federal Circuit).

 the United States Attorney is Alamdar S. Hamdani.

Along with the Western District of Texas, District of New Mexico, and District of Arizona, it is one of the busiest district courts in terms of criminal felony filings.

History 

Since its foundation, the Southern District of Texas has been served by forty-one District Judges and six Clerks of Court. The first federal judge in Texas was John C. Watrous, who was appointed on May 26, 1846, and had previously served as Attorney General of the Republic of Texas. He was assigned to hold court in Galveston, at the time, the largest city in the state. As seat of the Texas Judicial District, the Galveston court had jurisdiction over the whole state. On February 21, 1857, the state was divided into two districts, Eastern and Western, with Judge Watrous continuing in the Eastern district. Judge Watrous and Judge Thomas H. DuVal, of the Western District of Texas, left the state on the secession of Texas from the Union, the only two United States Judges not to resign their posts in states that seceded. When Texas was restored to the Union, Watrous and DuVal resumed their duties and served until 1870. Judge Amos Morrill served in the Eastern District of Texas from 1872 to 1884. He was succeeded by Chauncy B. Sabin (1884 to 1890) and David E. Bryant (1890 to 1902). In 1902, when the Southern District was created by Act of Congress, Judge Bryant continued to serve in the Eastern District of Texas.

In 1917, the General Services Administration added courtrooms and judicial offices to the second floor of the 1861 U.S. Customs House in Galveston, and it became the new federal courthouse for the Southern District of Texas. This location would later become the seat of the Galveston Division, after Congress added a second judgeship in the 1930s.

The Southern District of Texas started with one judge, Waller T. Burns, and a Clerk of Court, Christopher Dart, seated in Galveston. Since that time, the court has grown to nineteen district judgeships, six bankruptcy judgeships, fourteen magistrate judgeships, and over 200 deputy clerks.

Galveston Division 

In 2007, criminal charges were filed against Judge Samuel B. Kent, the only District judge in the Galveston Division, who sat at the Federal Courthouse in Galveston, the oldest federal judgeship in the state.  Due to the litigation, Chief Judge Hayden Head transferred Kent and his staff to the Houston Division. Judge Kent subsequently pleaded guilty, in February 2009, to obstruction of justice and, after being impeached by the House of Representatives, resigned in June 2009. The next month, it was announced that Judge Kent's post would remain vacant for the time being, and a replacement judge would be assigned to McAllen, due to the increase in cases in the Texas border area concerning subjects such as drugs and immigration.

Laredo Division 

Laredo, Texas, is located on the northern bank of the Rio Grande River and is unique in its ability to operate international bridges between two Mexican states. The city presently maintains four border crossings and one rail bridge with the Mexican State of Tamaulipas at Nuevo Laredo and the Mexican State of Nuevo León at Colombia. Webb County also borders the State of Nuevo León and the State of Coahuila, Mexico, northwest of Laredo. Laredo is the largest inland port along the U.S.-Mexico border and the Pan American Highway leading into Mexico through Laredo stretches from Canada and continues into Central and South America. Because of its location and accessibility to Mexico, Laredo’s economy is primarily based on international trade with Mexico. According to the Laredo Development Foundation, more than 700 of the Fortune 1,000 companies do international business via Laredo and more than 9,000 trucks cross through town per day along with 1,800 loaded rail cars. Laredo is ranked first in growth in Texas and seventh in the country by the Milken Institute.

The division encompasses five counties with the federal courthouse located in Laredo, Texas. There are two Laredo district court judges⁠—Judges Diana Saldaña and Marina Garcia Marmolejo, who presided over more than 2,000 felony cases in 2013⁠—most of which involved charges of narcotics trafficking and alien smuggling. In addition, there are three federal magistrates who alternate duties every two weeks. Additionally, the federal grand jury convenes every other week where AUSAs rotate the responsibility of presenting felony cases.

Jurisdiction 

The jurisdiction of the Southern District of Texas is divided as follows:
 The Brownsville Division covers Cameron and Willacy Counties.
 The Corpus Christi Division covers Aransas, Bee, Brooks, Duval, Jim Wells, Kenedy, Kleberg, Live Oak, Nueces, and San Patricio Counties.
 The Galveston Division covers Brazoria, Chambers, Galveston, and Matagorda Counties.
 The Houston Division covers Austin, Brazos, Colorado, Fayette, Fort Bend, Grimes, Harris, Madison, Montgomery, San Jacinto, Walker, Waller, and Wharton Counties.
 The Laredo Division covers Jim Hogg, La Salle, McMullen, Webb, and Zapata Counties.
 The McAllen Division covers Hidalgo and Starr Counties.
 The Victoria Division covers Calhoun, DeWitt, Goliad, Jackson, Lavaca, Refugio, and Victoria Counties.

Current judges 
:

Vacancies and pending nominations

Former judges

Chief judges

Succession of seats

List of U.S. Attorneys 
 Marcus C. McLemore	1902 – 1906
 Lodowick McDaniel	1906 – 1914
 John Edward Green Jr.	1914 – 1919
 David Edward Simmons	1919 – 1922
 Henry Matthews Holden	1922 – 1934
 Douglas Wear McGregor	1934 – 1944
 Brian Sylvester Odem	1944 – 1954
 Malcolm Richard Wilkey 1954 – 1957
 William B. Butler	1957 – 1961
 Woodrow Bradley Seals 1961 – 1966
 Morton Lee Susman	1966 – 1969
 Anthony Perez Farris	1969 – 1974
 Edward B. McDonough Jr. 1974 – 1977
 Jose Antonio Canales	1977 – 1980
 Daniel Kuldell Hedges	1981 – 1985
 Henry K. Oncken	1985 – 1990
 Ronald G. Woods	1990 – 1993
 Gaynelle Griffin Jones 1993 – 1997
 Mervyn Milton Mosbacker 1999 – 2001
 Michael T. Shelby 2001 – 2005
 Donald J. DeGabrielle 2006 – 2008
 Kenneth Magidson  2011 – 2017
 Ryan Patrick      2018  – 2021
 Alamdar Hamdani 2022

See also 
 Courts of Texas
 List of current United States district judges
 List of United States federal courthouses in Texas

References

External links 
 U.S. District Court for the Southern District of Texas

Texas, Southern District
Texas law
Organizations based in Houston
Brownsville, Texas
Corpus Christi, Texas
Galveston, Texas
Laredo, Texas
McAllen, Texas
Victoria, Texas
Courthouses in Texas
1902 establishments in Texas
Courts and tribunals established in 1902